Jorge "Tote" Castañeda Reyes (born 12 January 1970) is a Mexican former professional footballer who played as a midfielder during his career. He was the captain of the Mexico national football team competing at the 1992 Summer Olympics in Barcelona, Spain.

Club career
In 1987, when he was eighteen, Castañeda signed with Club Atlas.  He remained with Atlas until 1996.  On 13 March 1997, Castañeda signed with the Colorado Rapids of Major League Soccer. He returned to Mexico and finished his career with Cruz Azul, Cruz Azul Hidalgo, Tecos de UAG, Tigrillos and Lobos de la BUAP.

Castañeda managed Atlas on an interim basis following Rubén Omar Romano's departure in September 2007.

Personal life
Castañeda's brother, Guadalupe, was also a professional footballer.

References

External links

1970 births
Living people
Footballers from Guadalajara, Jalisco
Association football midfielders
Mexican footballers
Footballers at the 1992 Summer Olympics
Olympic footballers of Mexico
Atlas F.C. footballers
Colorado Rapids players
Cruz Azul footballers
Tecos F.C. footballers
Major League Soccer players
Mexican expatriate footballers
Expatriate soccer players in the United States
Mexican expatriate sportspeople in the United States
Mexican football managers
Atlas F.C. managers
Medalists at the 1991 Pan American Games
Pan American Games silver medalists for Mexico
Pan American Games medalists in football
Footballers at the 1991 Pan American Games